Barbalho is a surname. Notable people with the surname include:
Álvaro Barbalho Uchôa Cavalcanti (1818–1889), Brazilian judge and politician
Elcione Zahluth Barbalho (born 1944), Brazilian pedagogue and politician
Helder Barbalho (born 1979), Brazilian administrator, politician, the current governor of the state of Pará
Jader Barbalho (born 1944), Brazilian politician, businessman and landowner from the state of Pará

Portuguese-language surnames
Surnames of Brazilian origin